Francis Frederic Guy Warman  was Archdeacon of Aston from 1965 to 1977.

Born the son of Frederic Sumpter Guy Warman on 1 December 1904, Warman was educated at Weymouth College, Worcester College, Oxford and Ridley Hall, Cambridge. He was ordained in 1928  and served curacies  in  Radford, Coventry and Chilvers Coton. He held incumbencies in Selby, Leeds and Birmingham. He was Proctor in Convocation for the Diocese of Birmingham from 1945 to 1975.
He died on 25 July 1991.

References

1904 births
People educated at Weymouth College (public school)
Alumni of Worcester College, Oxford
Alumni of Ridley Hall, Cambridge
Archdeacons of Aston
1991 deaths